The Bloody Farm (Turkish: Kanlı Çiftlik) is a 1953 Turkish drama film directed by Faruk Kenç.

Cast
 Belgin Doruk 
 Mahir Özerdem 
 Bülent Ufuk 
 Vedat Karaokçu 
 Mine Coskun 
 Zeki Alpan
 Ali Üstüntas 
 Zihni Rona 
 Aliye Rona
 Necmi Büken 
 Cemal Karakas 
 Kadir Savun

References

Bibliography
 Mustafa Gökmen. Eski İstanbul sinemaları. İstanbul Kitaplığı Yayınları, 1991.

External links
 

1953 films
1953 drama films
1950s Turkish-language films
Turkish drama films
Turkish black-and-white films